Stanley Poreda (January 30, 1909 - November, 1983) was a Jersey City boxer considered a top heavyweight contender in the early 1930s.

Born on January 30, 1909, in Jersey City, New Jersey, Poreda was managed by Bill Reppenhagen, and trained by Joe Jennette. He was known alternately as the Jersey City Pole or the Polish Giant.  He achieved 24 wins, with 11 knockouts and ten losses. Standing at 6'2", and weighing 210 pounds, he was considered the top contender for heavyweight champion in 1932. He fought and sparred with many great heavyweights of the 1930s including Joe Louis, Primo Carnera, Max Baer, Max Schmeling, Tommy Loughran and Ernie Schaaf.
He retired from fighting in 1935 and became a Jersey City police officer and is a member of the New Jersey Boxing Hall of Fame.

External links

1909 births
1983 deaths
Boxers from New Jersey
American people of Polish descent
Heavyweight boxers
American male boxers
Sportspeople from Jersey City, New Jersey